Beko'a (lit. Splitting) is a moshav in central Israel. Located near Beit Shemesh, it falls under the jurisdiction of Mateh Yehuda Regional Council.

History
The village was established in 1952 by immigrants from Yemen on land that had belonged to the Palestinian village of Dayr Muhaysin, which was depopulated in 1948. Its name is symbolic and refers to the division of Jerusalem following the 1948 Arab–Israeli War.

References

Moshavim
Populated places established in 1952
Populated places in Jerusalem District
Yemeni-Jewish culture in Israel
1952 establishments in Israel